= Vadakshivale =

- Town
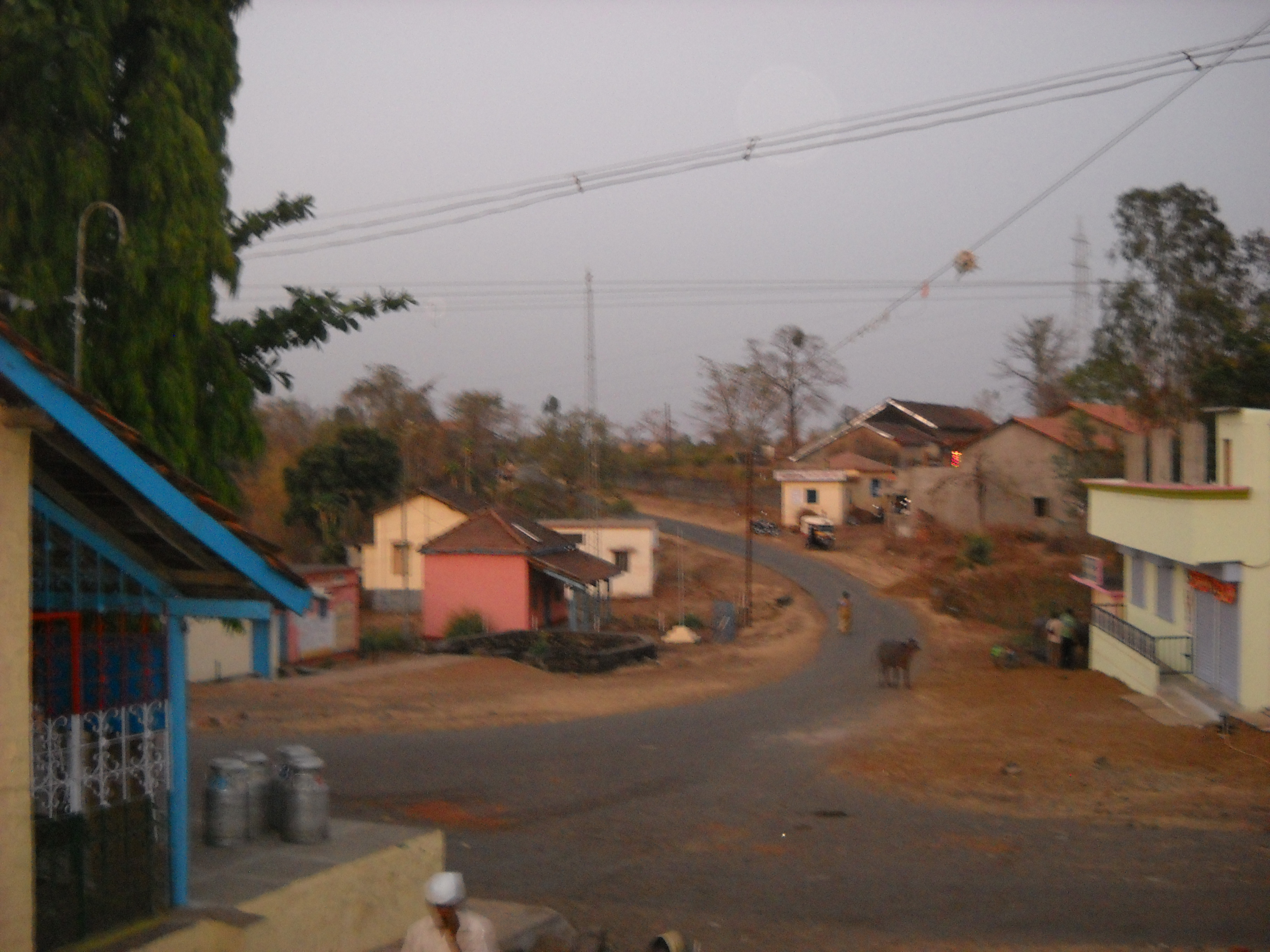
- Country: India
- Province: Maharashtra
- District: Kolhapur
- Time zone: IST (UTC +5.30)

Vadakshivale is a village in Kolhapur district, Maharashtra, India. Kaleshwar Primary and Secondary Schools are located there.

== Industry ==
The main occupation of the people in this village is agriculture. Most of the agriculture depends on rainwater. The main crops in this area in Kharif are rice, ground nut, rabi, and sorghum. Nowadays with help of groundwater using boring, some farmers are experimenting with commercial crops like sugarcane.
